Bulbophyllum complanatum is a species of orchid in the genus Bulbophyllum.

References

complanatum
Taxa named by Joseph Marie Henry Alfred Perrier de la Bâthie